Iešjávri (or Iesjavri) is a large lake on the border of the three municipalities of Alta, Kautokeino, and Karasjok in Troms og Finnmark  county, Norway.

The lake flows out into the river Iešjohka, a tributary of the large river Karasjohka.

See also
List of lakes in Norway

References and notes

External links
 Web site discussing Iešjávri —includes photographs

Alta, Norway
Kautokeino
Karasjok
Lakes of Troms og Finnmark